Elisabet "Lisa" Klinga (born 5 April 1991) is a Swedish football attacking midfielder currently playing for Damallsvenskan club Vittsjö GIK. She previously played for Tyresö FF and Piteå IF on loan. She has played in the Champions League with Linköpings FC. She previously represented Sweden on the  under-19 national team.

References

External links
 

1991 births
Living people
Swedish women's footballers
Expatriate women's footballers in Norway
Swedish expatriate women's footballers
Swedish expatriate sportspeople in Norway
Damallsvenskan players
Toppserien players
Linköpings FC players
Piteå IF (women) players
Tyresö FF players
Vittsjö GIK players
Women's association football midfielders